The left gastroepiploic vein (left gastro-omental vein) receives branches from the antero-superior and postero-inferior surfaces of the stomach and from the greater omentum; it runs from right to left along the greater curvature of the stomach and ends in the commencement of the splenic vein.

The splenic vein and superior mesenteric vein join to form the hepatic portal vein.

References 

Veins of the torso
Stomach